The Khuut Coal Mine is a coal mine located in the Matad sum of Dornod aimag in eastern Mongolia.

References

coal mines in Mongolia